Horam may have the following meanings

 Horam, a village in the Weald of Sussex.
 John Horam, a British politician and Member of Parliament
 Horam, a name that appears in the Bible, meaning 'their hill'. 
 HoRam, a sometimes used nickname for pitcher Horacio Ramírez